Satyajeet Sudhir Tambe is a member of the Maharashtra Legislative Council from the Nashik Graduate constituency in Maharashtra, India.  He contested and won the Maharashtra Legislative Council elections from Nashik Graduate constituency in 2023. He was associated with the Indian National Congress till 2022.

Early life and education 
Satyajit Tambe was born in Sangamner to Sudhir Tambe and Durgatai Tambe, Mayor of Sangamner Municipal Council. His grandfather Bhausaheb Thorat was a great freedom fighter and one of the pioneers of the co-operative movement in Maharashtra. He comes from a highly educated family actively involved in social causes in north Maharashtra and surrounding areas. He is the nephew of former minister in the Maharashtra government and senior Congress leader Balasaheb Thorat. 

Satyajit Tambe is a postgraduate in management and political science. He has also studied at the John F. Kennedy School at Harvard University in the US.

Personal life 
Satyajit Tambe is married to Dr. Maithili and they have a daughter and a son.

References 

1983 births
Living people
People from Ahmednagar district
Members of the Maharashtra Legislative Council
Independent politicians in India
Indian National Congress politicians from Maharashtra